Ladi is a village in regional unit of Evros in Greece, at an altitude of 90 meters which is located north of the Erythropotamos which ends in the river Evros and east of the border line with Bulgaria.

Geography 
It is 25.5 km NW. of Didymoteicho and 35 km W.-SW. of Orestiada. According to the "Kallikratis" Program, it is the local community of Ladi that belongs to the Metaxades municipal unit of the Didymoteicho municipality and according to the 2011 census it has a population of 180 inhabitants.

History 
During the period of the Ottoman rule, it was a farmstead of an agha, referred to as "Emblindin" or "Imblindin" and was an intermediate station between Ivaylovgrad and Didymoteicho. The local Greek workers who worked on the farm bought the estates and founded the village Ladi.

References 

Evros (regional unit)
Villages in Greece
Didymoteicho
Populated places in Evros (regional unit)